Michel Armand (born 1946) is a French scientist who is best known for helping with the invention of Lithium batteries.

Lithium batteries are electrochemical devices that are widely used as power sources. The history of their development has contributions from many scientists, but in particular without the developments by Professor Michel Armand related to the electrodes and electrolytes the lithium batteries of today would not exist as the foundation for electronic devices.

He runs a research team in Spain at CIC energigune and has had his work published in nature.

"CIC energiGUNE is very well equipped; in fact, it is providing to researchers all the environment for doing super-science." M.Armand.

References

Lithium
21st-century French scientists
Battery inventors
Living people
1946 births